Cherry Lake is an artificial lake in the Stanislaus National Forest of Tuolumne County, California, United States.

Cherry Lake may also referf to:

 Cherry Lake (horse) (foaled 1966), an American Thoroughbred
 Cherry Lake (Victoria), wetlands converted to a lake in Altona, Melbourne, Australia
 Cherry Lake (South Dakota), a lake in the U.S.
 Cherry Lake, Florida, a place in the U.S.